Johar Mohamed Zarwan (born 23 April 1996) is a Sri Lankan professional footballer who plays as a midfielder for Colombo FC.

International career

International goals
Scores and results list Sri Lanka's goal tally first.

References

External links
 

Sri Lankan footballers
1996 births
Living people
Sri Lanka international footballers
Association football midfielders
Sri Lankan Muslims
Colombo FC players
Sri Lanka Football Premier League players